Juan del Carmen Cámara Mesa (born 13 February 1994) is a Spanish professional footballer who plays as a winger for Polish club Jagiellonia Białystok.

Club career
Born in Jaén, Andalusia as the son of a goalkeeper for Real Jaén, Cámara finished his youth career with Villarreal CF. On 3 June 2012, the very last day of the season in Segunda División, he made his debut as a professional, playing 27 minutes for their reserves in a 0–1 home defeat against Deportivo de La Coruña.

On 3 July 2014, Cámara joined another reserve team, FC Barcelona Atlètic also of the second division. He scored his first professional goal on 28 September, netting his side's second in a 3–3 draw away to RCD Mallorca. He finished his first year with six goals in 30 matches, including a brace in a 3–1 home win over Recreativo de Huelva on 18 January 2015.

Cámara was first included in FC Barcelona's main squad on 23 August 2015, remaining an unused substitute in their 1–0 La Liga victory at Athletic Bilbao which was the season's opener. He first appeared in the UEFA Champions League on 9 December, replacing Jordi Alba for the last 16 minutes of an eventual 1–1 away draw with Bayer 04 Leverkusen as the Spaniards had already secured the first place in their group.

On 10 February 2016, Cámara came on for Ivan Rakitić in the 76rd minute of a 1–1 away draw against Valencia CF in the second leg of the semi-finals of the Copa del Rey, providing the assist for Wilfrid Kaptoum's goal. This scoreline also served to extend Barcelona's unbeaten run to 29 games, breaking the previous record of 28 set under Pep Guardiola in the 2010–11 campaign.

On 31 August 2016, Cámara was loaned to division two club Girona FC for one year. After appearing rarely in an eventual promotion, he moved to CF Reus Deportiu in the same tier on 10 August 2017, also on a one-year loan deal.

On 9 August 2018, free agent Cámara moved abroad for the first time in his career, after signing a three-year contract with Miedź Legnica in the Polish Ekstraklasa. The following 31 May, he joined Jagiellonia Białystok of the same league on a four-year deal.

Cámara spent the following seasons on loan, at Romanian clubs FC Dinamo București and CS Universitatea Craiova as well as Sabah FC in the Azerbaijan Premier League.

Career statistics

Club

Honours
Barcelona
Copa del Rey: 2015–16

Universitatea Craiova
Cupa României: 2020–21

Notes

References

External links

1994 births
Living people
Spanish footballers
Footballers from Jaén, Spain
Association football wingers
Segunda División players
Segunda División B players
Tercera División players
Villarreal CF C players
Villarreal CF B players
FC Barcelona Atlètic players
FC Barcelona players
Girona FC players
CF Reus Deportiu players
Ekstraklasa players
III liga players
Miedź Legnica players
Jagiellonia Białystok players
Liga I players
FC Dinamo București players
CS Universitatea Craiova players
Azerbaijan Premier League players
Sabah FC (Azerbaijan) players
Spain youth international footballers
Spanish expatriate footballers
Expatriate footballers in Poland
Expatriate footballers in Romania
Expatriate footballers in Azerbaijan
Spanish expatriate sportspeople in Poland
Spanish expatriate sportspeople in Romania
Spanish expatriate sportspeople in Azerbaijan